Formica gnava is a species of ant in the family Formicidae.

References

Further reading

 

gnava
Articles created by Qbugbot
Insects described in 1866